Greater Moncton Roméo LeBlanc International Airport (GMIA) or Moncton/Greater Moncton Roméo LeBlanc International Airport  is located in the city of Dieppe  east northeast of downtown Moncton, New Brunswick, Canada. Originally named Greater Moncton International Airport, the airport was renamed in 2016, in honour of former Governor General Roméo LeBlanc.

The GMIA handled 674,406 passengers and 122,308 aircraft movements in 2019.

Designated as an international airport by Transport Canada, it is staffed by the Canada Border Services Agency (CBSA). CBSA officers at this airport currently can handle aircraft with up to 300 passengers. Nevertheless, planes as large as the 580 passenger Boeing 747 have been handled.

GMIA is home to the Moncton Flight College, the largest flight college in Canada.

History 
On January 11, 1928, the first scheduled air flight out of the Greater Moncton area took place. This flight was carrying mail and passengers to the Magdalen Islands. Two sites were considered for the first air strip. Leger's Corner was chosen however because of more favourable landing conditions. Part of this land was donated to the city of Moncton by Simon B. LeBlanc of Leger's Corner, a developer, land owner and owner of the LeBlanc general store and post office located on the south corner of the now named streets of Acadie Avenue and Champlain Street.

In 1929, a local private company bought the land at Léger's Corner airstrip and through the years two runways were constructed as well as structures for aircraft maintenance. It was also in 1929 that the Moncton Aero Club was founded, as was the International Airways Flying School. These later became the Moncton Flight College, one of the pre-eminent flight schools in Canada. Also in the same year, the airport expanded its air mail service to include Prince Edward Island and Montreal.

In 1936, Transport Canada and the local government discussed the possibility of the construction of an airport suitable for trans-Canadian routes. The Léger's Corner site was unsuitable for expansion and instead they chose a site in nearby Lakeburn as the new site for the airport. A paved runway and two additional dirt landing strips were constructed.

In March 1940, the Department of National Defence opened a No. 8 Service Flying Training School(SFTF) at the newly developed RCAF Station Moncton under the auspices of the British Commonwealth Air Training Plan. The school trained war pilots for the Commonwealth nations. A new hangar was also constructed at the airport during the war to serve as a repair and maintenance facility.

During the 1940s, civilian air services expanded and became available serving Montreal, Halifax, Charlottetown, Sydney, Saint John, Fredericton and Newfoundland. The hangar of Trans-Canada Airlines (later Air Canada), became the location for the first air terminal. In 1952, a larger hangar was converted into a modern air terminal but it was very shortly thereafter destroyed by fire. In 1953, a replacement air terminal was constructed.

Further expansion in 1964 brought many changes to the airport including an air traffic control tower and a new operations building. In 1976, the air terminal was again expanded.

Throughout the years, many renovations were made to the air terminal building, including in 1998–99, an international arrivals area to suit the needs of 1999's eighth Sommet de la Francophonie. A large landing apron was constructed at the same time at the opposite side of the airport in a location which would later become the site of the new international airport terminal. This landing apron would be pressed into service in a dramatic manner on September 11, 2001 when airspace over North America was shut down following the World Trade Center attacks. A dozen flights with over 2,000 passengers were diverted to the Greater Moncton Airport.

In May 2001, the new, state-of-the-art international air terminal was completed and officially opened in 2002 by Queen Elizabeth II. The Greater Moncton International Airport is the busiest airport in New Brunswick, servicing more than 552,629 passengers per year.

In May 2006, Continental Airlines' subsidiary Continental Express began Moncton's only nonstop service to the United States with once-daily (sometimes twice daily) flights to Newark Liberty International Airport in Newark, New Jersey, near New York City. However, the service between Moncton and Newark was ended on September 19, 2014.

FedEx Express, TC Ventus Freight and Purolator Courier also have large hangars at the airport.

Due to the COVID-19 pandemic, the annual passenger traffic, which was steadily increasing, suddenly plummeted in 2020.

Airlines and destinations

Passenger

Cargo

Statistics

Annual traffic

See also
 Moncton/McEwen Airport
 Transportation in Greater Moncton

References

External links

 Greater Moncton International Airport

Certified airports in New Brunswick
Buildings and structures in Dieppe, New Brunswick
Transport in Moncton
Transport in Dieppe, New Brunswick
Transport in Greater Moncton
National Airports System